The Ambassador of Australia to Cambodia is an officer of the Australian Department of Foreign Affairs and Trade and the head of the Embassy of the Commonwealth of Australia to the Kingdom of Cambodia. The current ambassador, since January 2020, is Pablo Kang.

The Australian Legation in Phnom Penh was first raised to Embassy status in 1959, and came to an end in 1975 when the Lon Nol Government was overthrown. The Embassy remained closed during Khmer Rouge rule and subsequent war periods, and was reopened in 1992 after a treaty establishing the United Nations Transitional Authority in Cambodia was signed.

List of heads of mission

References

 
Cambodia
Australia